François Vallejo (1960, Le Mans) is a French professor of literature and a writer.

Passionate about Claudel, then by Louis-Ferdinand Céline, François Vallejo studied letters. He became a professor of classical literature at Le Havre and began writing novels at the end of the 1990s.

In 2001, his novel Madame Angeloso was part of the second selection of the Prix Goncourt and was also selected for the Femina and the Renaudot.

Work 
All his books are published by :
1998: Vacarme dans la salle de bal
2000: Pirouettes dans les ténèbres
2001: Madame Angeloso – prix "roman" de France-Télévisions 2001
2003: Groom – prix des libraires and  2004
2005: Le Voyage des grands hommes
2006:  – prix du Livre Inter 2007
2007: Dérive
2008: L’Incendie du Chiado
2010: Les Sœurs Brelan
2012: Métamorphoses
2014: Fleur et Sang
2016: Un dangereux plaisir

External links 
 Official website of publisher Viviane Hamy
 Introduction to L'incendie du Chiado and Introduction to 'Ouest' on magazine Culture a confine
  Tant qu’il y aura des gens pour recevoir, alors j’aurai envie de donner on Le Figaro
 François Vallejo: Itinéraire d'un djihadiste raté on Biliobs

21st-century French novelists
Prix des libraires winners
Prix du Livre Inter winners
People from Le Mans
1960 births
Living people